Stardust is the third studio album by German singer Lena Meyer-Landrut. It was released on 12 October 2012 on Universal Music. The album marked a departure from her previous work on her debut album My Cassette Player (2010) and follow-up Good News (2011). Meyer-Landrut Both collaborated with Swen Meyer, and Sonny Boy Gustafsson on the majority of the album. Stardust became her third album to reach the top two of the German Albums Chart. The album and its first single of the same name achieved gold certification in Germany.

Background
Stardust marked Meyer-Landrut's first album without contribution from former mentor, entertainer Stefan Raab. Principal songwriting began in late summer 2011 and during that process Lena made travels to Stockholm, London, and Hamburg. Throughout the sessions, she collaborated with musicians like Matthew Benbrook, Pauline Taylor, Johnny McDaid, James Flannigan, and Sonny Boy Gustafsson, who produced five of the songs. Stardust was also partly produced by Swen Meyer in Hamburg. Production on the album was finished in July 2012. Four titles were written in collaboration with Miss Li of which the song "ASAP" is a duet with the Swedish singer-songwriter.

Meyer-Landrut participated on nine songs as co-author.  "Better News" and "I'm Black" were composed in collaboration with Ian Dench. The idea to "Don't Panic" was inspired by a fire alert in London. "Mr Arrow Key" is about a guide for the things of life. "Pink Elephant" covers the story of a girl who is clumsy like an elephant. "Goosebumps" is a song about homesickness. "To the Moon" is a love song which took Lena, her co-writer Alexander Schroer and producer Swen Meyer seven months to find suitable lyrics for a certain melody. "Neon (Lonely People)" describes the feeling of loneliness despite the fact that someone is among people. Additionally there is a hidden track called "Lille katt" performed in Swedish language previously known from the Swedish-German children's television series Emil i Lönneberga. The iTunes version features a cover version of the title "Moonlight", previously performed by American singer Mayaeni in 2010.

Promotion
The album's lead single, "Stardust" was released on 21 September 2012, while the music video to this song was first shown on 7 September 2012. It charted at number two on the German Singles Chart. On 20 September 2012, Lena previewed the album to a larger audience at the Reeperbahn Festival in the music venue Schmidt's Tivoli in Hamburg. From 5 to 7 October 2012 iTunes pre-released three songs to promote the album. "To the Moon" was the first download, followed by "ASAP" on 6 October and "Pink Elephant" on 7 October.

On April, Meyer-Landrut was touring the Germany, while promoting her album. The tour was called 'No One Can Catch Us', and it's the lyrics from her latest's album lead single Stardust. The tour started on 2 April, in Stuttgart, and ended on 21 April, in Offenbach. Also, Lena was streaming her last show on internet for her fans, who couldn't come to one of her shows. The tour was made of 13 shows in different German cities like Berlin, Hamburg, Hannover and more. Lena also wanted to make a show in Vienna, Austria, but later, the show was cancelled for unknown reasons.

Critical reception

Overall, Stardust received generally mixed to positive reviews from music critics. Several reviewers pointed out that former mentor Stefan Raab was not asked to participate in the production. The German issue of Rolling Stone magazine gave Stardust three out of five stars and wrote that "merely that this time you actually have the feeling that this is really Lena, and not Stefan Raab's idea of Lena." Neue Presse gave four out of five stars and stated: "No Raab anymore, no more under his wing. Lena spread her 'pop' wings."

Matthias Reichel, writing for critic site CDStarts.de, gave the album seven out of ten stars. He called the album "good work" and noted: "If you allow her a little patience for the artistic development that is already moving in the right direction on Stardust, everyone will be satisfied." Kai Butterweck from laut.de rate the album three out of five stars and wrote that "if you look at it from a sporting point of view, you could say that eleven completely capable team players have gathered around extravagant playmaker Stardust who ultimately guarantee a coherent team appearance – promising basic requirements that not every ambitious professional team can offer."

Track listing

Charts

Weekly charts

Year-end charts

Certifications

Release history 

 Vinyl version was an autographed version limited to 1000 copies exclusively sold by Amazon Germany.

References

2012 albums
Lena Meyer-Landrut albums